Alireza Mohammad (born 14 July 1981 in mazandaran, Iran) is a former Iranian football defender who is currently coach of Persepolis youth U-16 team.

On 11 June 2008 also, Mohammad signed a two-year deal with Iran Pro League champions Persepolis as a player.

Club career
After signing with Persepolis, he became a starter right away under head coach Afshin Ghotbi and during the same season when Afshin Peyrovani and Nelo Vingada took over as the managers of the club, he was still a starter both in the league and the AFC Champions League. He is mostly remembered by his great dribbling ability, his runs down the right side and also his speed which all helped Persepolis tremendously during the 2008/09 season. Although having outstanding speed, Mohammad is not as efficient when crossing, making him waste a lot of opportunities while going forward.

Club career statistics

 Assist Goals

International career
Afshin Ghotbi had shown how much he believed in Mohammad and when Ghotbi became the coach of the national team, he called up Mohammad for his first international cap which was made in a friendly against China on June 1, 2009 when he came on as a substitute at half time for Ehsan Hajsafi.

Honours

Hazfi Cup
Winner: 2
2009/10 with Persepolis
2010/11 with Persepolis

References

External links 
 Alireza Mohammad at PersianLeague.com
 

1981 births
Living people
People from Tehran
Iranian footballers
Rah Ahan players
Persepolis F.C. players
Gahar Zagros players
Zob Ahan Esfahan F.C. players
Paykan F.C. players
Association football defenders
Iran international footballers